Horizontal integration is the process of a company increasing production of goods or services at the same part of the supply chain. A company may do this via internal expansion, acquisition or merger.

The process can lead to monopoly if a company captures the vast majority of the market for that product or service.

Horizontal integration contrasts with vertical integration, where companies integrate multiple stages of production of a small number of production units.

Horizontal alliance

Horizontal integration is related to horizontal alliance (also known as horizontal cooperation). However, in the case of a horizontal alliance, the partnering companies set up a contract, but remain independent. For example, Raue & Wieland (2015) describe the example of legally independent logistics service providers who cooperate. Such an alliance relates to competition.

Aspects 
Benefits of horizontal integration to both the firm and society may include economies of scale and economies of scope. For the firm, horizontal integration may provide a strengthened presence in the reference market. It may also allow the horizontally integrated firm to engage in monopoly pricing, which is disadvantageous to society as a whole and which may cause regulators to ban or constrain horizontal integration.

Media terms 
Media critics, such as Robert W. McChesney, have noted that the current trend within the entertainment industry has been toward the increased concentration of media ownership into the hands of a smaller number of transmedia and transnational conglomerates. Media is seen to amass in center where wealthy individuals have the ability to purchase such ventures (e.g., Rupert Murdoch).

That emerged are new strategies for content development and distribution designed to increase the "synergy" between the different divisions of the same company. Studios seek content that can move fluidly across media channels.

Examples 
An example of horizontal integration in the food industry was the Heinz and Kraft Foods merger. On 25 March 2015, Heinz and Kraft merged into one company, the deal valued at $46 billion. Both produce processed food for the consumer market.

On 9 December 2013, Sysco agreed to acquire US Foods but on 24 June 2015, the federal judge ruled against the deal saying that such merger would control 75% of the U.S. foodservice industry and that will stifle competition. It would have been horizontal integration, as both distribute food to restaurants, healthcare, and educational facilities.

On 16 November 2015, Marriott International announced that it would acquire Starwood for $13.6 billion, creating the world's largest hotel chain. The merger was finalized on 23 September 2016.

The AB-Inbev acquisition of SAB Miller for $107 Billion, which completed in 2016, is one of the biggest deals of all time.

On 1 November 2017, Centurylink bought Level 3 Communications for $34 billion, and incorporated Level 3 as part of Centurylink.

On 14 December 2017, The Walt Disney Company announced a $52.4 billion bid in stock to acquire 21st Century Fox along with its bulk of assets, which included the famed 20th Century Fox film studio and other assets such as FX Networks and 30% stake in Hulu. Both companies produced and distributed films and television series, as well as each owning a 30% stake in Hulu.

See also 

 Economies of scale
 Horizontal market
 List of economics topics
 List of management topics
 List of marketing topics
 Monopoly
 Strategic management
 Target market
 Vertical integration

References 

Market structure
Business terms
Strategic management
Marketing strategy
Mergers and acquisitions